"Makes Me Feel" is a 1994 single by Norwegian Eurodance group Devotion, consisting of singer Silya (Cecilie Hafstad) and rapper Jimmy James (James Ekgren). It was a commercial success on the Norwegian singles chart, peaking at number three. It spent a total of ten weeks on the chart. Additionally, it reached number 17 in Finland and number 91 on the Eurochart Hot 100. The accompanying music video was shot on a beach in Sweden, and also features Anneli Drecker from Bel Canto and Silvany Bricen from Trancylvania as dancers.

Devotion released a total of three singles during 1994-95 through the label Dance Pool: "Makes Me Feel", "Higher" and "Move Me". After the latter flopped, Silya left the group, and the project was discontinued.

Track listing

Charts

References

 

1994 debut singles
1994 songs
Devotion songs
Norwegian songs
English-language Norwegian songs
Eurodance songs
Dance Pool singles